The 34th Edition Vuelta a España (Tour of Spain), a long-distance bicycle stage race and one of the three grand tours, was held from 24 April to 13 May 1979. Zoetemelk won two of the three ITT's and Fons De Wolf won the other. De Wolf also won the points classification as well as five stages, but Zoetemelk won the race with a comfortable lead ahead of Spanish climbing specialist Francisco Galdós and Michel Pollentier. Felipe Yáñez won the mountains classification.

Teams and riders

Route

Results

Final General Classification

References

 
1979 in road cycling
1979
1979 in Spanish sport
April 1979 sports events in Europe
May 1979 sports events in Europe
1979 Super Prestige Pernod